Legacy of the Scottish Harpers Volume Two is a folk album released in 1986 by Robin Williamson.

Track listing 
Port Ballangowne
Nou Let Us Sing
Erskine's Lament
Blew Breiks
Doun In Yon Banke
Ettrick Banks
Bakaskie
Almayne
Leslie's Joog
My Lady Laudian's Lilt
Dance About the Bailzie's Dubb
My Lady Balclughe's Ayre
Port
Mall Simme
Ore Hills Ore Mountains Fancy Free

1986 albums
Robin Williamson albums